William Roetzheim is an American poet, publisher and playwright. He is the editor of the Regional Best series anthology of American plays.

Roetzheim has published 17 books, including the poetry collection, Thoughts I Left Behind, and more than one hundred scholarly articles. His dramatic works include the musical "T. S. Eliot" and N.I.C.E.

Among his honors are a "Best Books" National Book Award and an Independent Publisher Book Awards medal (IPPY) Award for poetry.  Other awards include USA Book News Best Book Award and top honors at the Moondance International Film Festival for his film, Decay.

Roetzheim lives in California.

References

External links
 Official website

Living people
American dramatists and playwrights
American male poets
American male dramatists and playwrights
Year of birth missing (living people)